Erismena is an opera in a prologue and three acts by Francesco Cavalli. First performed in Venice in 1655, it was designated as a dramma per musica.

Libretto

The Italian libretto was by Aurelio Aureli, the only work by this writer for Cavalli.
The work is also unusual for having been translated into English in the 17th century.
Erismena is the first full-length opera known to have been translated into English and may have been first performed in England in 1674.

Performance history
The performance history indicates that the opera was well received. It was first performed in Venice at the Teatro Sant 'Apollinare on 30 December 1655 with further performances between that date and 28 February 1656. Cavalli revised the work in 1670. Both versions have survived as well as one with an English translation, also dated to the 17th century.

The opera was revived in the 20th century, and was performed in California.
In the 21st century the opera has been performed by English Touring Opera, and by Leonardo García Alarcón and the Cappella Mediterranea for the Festival d'Aix-en-Provence.

Roles

Recordings
Pier Francesco Cavalli: L'Erismena  Sung in English 
Oakland Symphony Orchestra; Conductor: Alan Curtis.
Principal singers: Walt McKibben (Alcesta), Carole Bogard (Aldimira), Edward Jameson (Argippo), Leslie Retallick (Clerio), Edgar Jones (Diark), Walter Matthes (Erimante), Delreen Hafenrichter (Erismena), Holly Alonso (Flerida), Melvin Brown (Idraspe), Paul Esswood (Orimeno)  Recording date: 1968 Label: Vox - SVBX 5213 (LPs)
Cavalli: Erismena Sung in Italian
There is a live video recording of the 2017 production for the Festival D'Aix-en-Provence with Leonardo García Alarcón and the Cappella Mediterranea, starring sopranos Francesca Aspromonte and Susanna Hurrell, countertenors Carlo Vistoli and Jakub Jósef Orlinski, and baritone Alexander Miminoshvili. There is a full version available on YouTube.

Score
Many opera scores by Cavalli have survived among the manuscripts of Venice's Biblioteca Marciana. According to Grove, there are two versions of Erismena in the Marciana, the later one being an adaptation for a 1670 revival. There is another score in the Bodleian Library, Oxford.

While the libretto was published in 1655, the score was not published until 2018 when Bärenreiter edition appeared, based on one of the Marciana scores and the Bodleian score.

English version
A manuscript score of Erismena, with English libretto, is the oldest surviving opera score in England, dating from the 1670s. The score was in a private library until 2008. A public subscription raised £85,000 to donate the score to the Bodleian Library, Oxford, after export of the score had been blocked by the British Reviewing Committee on the Export of Works of Art. The manuscript has a unique allegorical prologue, with characters who do not feature in the opera; this is believed to indicate that the version was performed, or intended to be performed, for a Royal audience.

References

Notes

Sources

Clinkscale, Martha Novak (1992), " Erismena " in The New Grove Dictionary of Opera, ed. Stanley Sadie (London) 
Hall, George (9 October 2006) "Erismena" The Guardian. Accessed 7 September 07.

Operas
Operas by Francesco Cavalli
Opera in England
1655 operas